This is a list of television programs currently and formerly broadcast by Pogo TV. The channel was launched on 1 January 2004 and airs mainly animated programmings.

Current programming 
 Chhota Bheem
 Dennis the Menace and Gnasher
 Little Singham
 Super Bheem
 The Tom and Jerry Show (2014)
 Titoo

Former programming

Animated series 

 64 Zoo Lane
 A Pup Named Scooby-Doo
 The Addams Family (1973 TV series)
 The Addams Family (1992 TV series)
 The Adventures of Bottle Top Bill and His Best Friend Corky
 The Adventures of Rocky and Bullwinkle and Friends
 Amar Chitra Katha Tales
 Andy Pirki
 Appu – The Yogic Elephant
 Archie's Weird Mysteries
 Babar
 Baby Looney Tunes
 The Backyardigans
 Bandbudh Aur Budbak
 Barbie Dreamtopia
 The Batman
 Batman: The Animated Series
 Be Cool, Scooby-Doo!
 Bo on the Go
 Bob the Builder
 Bola Kampung
 Bunnicula
 The Bugs Bunny Show
 Caillou
 Chamki Ki Duniya
 Chaplin & Co
 Corneil and Bernie
 Dabangg: The Animated Series
 Dorothy and the Wizard of Oz
 Dragon Tales
 Duck Dodgers
 Ekans - Snakes Awake
 Ethelbert the Tiger
 The Flintstones
 Foster's Home for Imaginary Friends
 Franny's Feet
 Garfield and Friends
 Gordon the Garden Gnome
 Grizzy and the Lemmings
 The Happos Family
 Harry and His Bucket Full of Dinosaurs
 He-Man and the Masters of the Universe
 Inspector Gadget
 Jackie Chan Adventures
 The Jetsons
 Justice League
 Justice League Unlimited
 Kalari Kids
 Kipper
 King Arthur's Disasters
 The Koala Brothers
 Kong: The Animated Series
 Kumbh Karan
 The Life and Times of Juniper Lee
 LambuG TinguG
 Little Red Tractor
 Little Robots
 Loonatics Unleashed
 Looney Tunes
 Make Way for Noddy
 Miffy and Friends
 Mighty Raju
 Mr. Bean: The Animated Series
 Mr. Magoo
 The Mr. Men Show
 My Little Pony: Friendship is Magic
 The New Adventures of Hanuman
 The New Adventures of Peter Pan
 The New Batman Adventures
 New Looney Tunes
 The New Woody Woodpecker Show
 Oddbods
 Oswald
 Panshel World
 Pingu in the City
 Pet Alien
 Pingu
 Pink Panther
 The Pink Panther Show
 Pink Panther and Pals
 Planet Grabo
 The Popeye Show
 Postman Pat
 The Powerpuff Girls
 Richie Rich
 The Road Runner Show
 Robotboy
 Roll No 21
 Rupert Bear, Follow the Magic...
 Sabrina: The Animated Series
 Sabrina: Secrets of a Teenage Witch
 Shaktimaan: The Animated Series
 The Scooby-Doo Show
 Shadow of the Elves
 Sheep in the Big City
 Shopkins
 Singhasan Battisi
 Sitting Ducks
 Skyland
 The Smurfs
 Smaashhing Simmba
 The Spectacular Spider-Man
 Spider-Man: The New Animated Series
 Stickin' Around
 Strawberry Shortcake
 Strawberry Shortcake's Berry Bitty Adventures
 Stuart Little: The Animated Series
 Superman: The Animated Series
 Super Bheem
 The Sylvester and Tweety Mysteries
 Tashi
 Taz-Mania
 Teenage Mutant Ninja Turtles
 The Pandavas
 Thomas & Friends
 Time Squad
 Tiny Planets
 Tik Tak Tail
 Titoo 
 Tom and Jerry
 Tom and Jerry Kids
 The Tom and Jerry Show
 Tom and Jerry Tales
 Wacky Races
 Winx Club
 The Woody Woodpecker Show
 Anpanman
 Astro Boy
 The Genie Family
 Gon
 The Gutsy Frog
 Hagemaru
 The Jungle Book
 Kimba the White Lion
 Kirby: Right Back at Ya!
 Kiteretsu
 Kyorochan
 Mirmo!
 The Monster Kid
 Mojacko
 My Three Daughters
 Ninja Boy
 Obocchama Kun
 Pokémon
 Scan2Go
 Wonder Bevil
 Yo-kai Watch

Live-action 

 ALF
 Around the World in 80 Days with Michael Palin
 Bam Bam Bam Gir Pade Hum
 Barney & Friends
 Batman
 Beakman's World
 Blazing Teens
 Boohbah
 Bournvita Quiz Contest
 Brum
 Caprica
 Cambala Investigation Agency
 Captain Vyom
 Cavegirl
 Chhupa Rustam
 Clueless
 Don't Blame the Koalas
 F.A.Q.
 Family No.1
 Feather Boy
 Fimbles
 Finger Tips
 Flipper
 Galli Galli Sim Sim
 Gilligan's Island
 Hi-5
 Hole in the Wall
 Hollywood 7
 Hum Paanch
 I'm Old Enough
 It's Alive
 Just for Laughs: Gags
 Just For Laughs UK
 Just Kidding
 Just Mohabbat
 Karma
 Khichdi
 L.A. 7
 Lois & Clark: The New Adventures of Superman
 The Magician's House
 M.A.D. Make It Easy
 Magicskool
 Malgudi Days
 Miami 7
 Mighty Morphin Power Rangers
 Mr. Bean
 The Nightmare Room
 Nile
 Noah and Saskia
 Pogo All Stars
 Pogo Funtakshri
 Prime Pogo
 Play with Me Sesame
 Robot Wars: Lohe ke waar
 Round the Twist
 Sabrina the Teenage Witch
 Sahara
 Samne Wali Khidki
 Sazer-X
 Shaktimaan
 Sherlock Holmes
 Shoebox Zoo
 Skatoony
 The Sleepover Club
 Soori Poori
 Sunaina
 Takeshi's Castle
 Teletubbies
 Teletubbies Everywhere
 Thumb Wrestling Federation
 Tweenies
 Two of a Kind
 Ultraman Tiga
 Unbeatable Banzuke
 Ultraman: Towards the Future
 Ultraman: The Ultimate Hero
 Viva S Club
 Walking with Beasts
 Walking with Dinosaurs
 Wicked Science
 Wonder Woman
 World's Craziest Videos
 The World's Funniest!
 Worst Best Friends

Movies 
 Bhoot Raja Aur Ronnie (2012)
 Chatpat Jhatpat (2012)
 Hamara Hero Shaktimaan (2013)
 Sholay Adventures (2015)
 Sonu VS Soni (2014)

Chhota Bheem 
 Chhota Bheem Aur Krishna
 Chhota Bheem & Krishna: Pataliputra- City of the Dead
 Chhota Bheem: Bheem vs Aliens
 Chhota Bheem: Journey To Petra
 Chhota Bheem & Krishna: Mayanagari
 Chhota Bheem: Master of Shaolin
 Chhota Bheem: Dholakpur to Kathmandu
 Chhota Bheem Aur Hanuman
 Chhota Bheem : The Rise Of Kirmada
 Chhota Bheem Aur Ganesh:In The Amazing Odessey
 Chhota Bheem And The Crown of Valahalla
 Chhota Bheem and the Incan Adventure
 Chhota Bheem aur Krishna vs Zimbara
 Chhota Bheem And The Shinobi Secret
 Chhota Bheem Aur Arazim Ka Raaz

Mighty Raju 
 Mighty Raju vs The Great Pirate
 Chak De ! Mighty Raju
 Game Over Mighty Raju

Titoo - Har Jawab Ka Sawaal Hu 
 Titoo In Ocean Kingdom

Ekans - Snakes Awake 
 Ekans – The Mystery Of Three Gems (October 09, 2022)
 Ekans – Hero Ek Villain Anek (October 16, 2022)

Specials 
 Back to the '50s
 Boyfriends & Birthdays
 Chhota Bheem Dholakpur Ka Singham
 Chhota Bheem Aur Salman Ki Kick
 Creature Comforts
 Robbie the Reindeer
 Shrek the Halls
 The Happy Elf
 Wallace and Gromit 
 Ekans: Origin Story (September 04, 2022)

See also 
 Cartoon Network (Indian TV channel)
 List of programmes broadcast by Cartoon Network (India)

References 

Pogo (TV channel) original programming
P
P
Pogo